Mati Unt (1 January 1944 Linnamäe, Voore Parish (now Voore, Mustvee Parish), Jõgeva County, Estonia – 22 August 2005, Tallinn) was an Estonian writer, essayist and theatre director.

Biography
His first novel, written at the age of 18 after having finished high school, was Hüvasti, kollane kass (Goodbye, Yellow Cat). He completed his education in literature, journalism and philology at the University of Tartu. After that, he served as Director of the Vanemuine Theater from 1966 to 1972, held the same position at the Youth Theater until 1991, and then at the Estonian Drama Theatre until 2003, when he became a freelance writer.

Unt was married to television journalist and screenwriter Ela Tomson from 1965, until their divorce in 1973.

He joined the Estonian Writers' Union in 1966. In 1980, he was named an Honored Writer of the Estonian SSR and, that same year, became one of the signatories to the Letter of 40 intellectuals. In 2000, was awarded the Order of the White Star

In 2005, not long before his death, he became a Professor of liberal arts at the University. He is buried in the Metsakalmistu cemetery in Tallinn.

Works
Four successive novels, Võlg (The Debt, 1964), Elu võimalikkusest kosmoses (On the possibility of life in space, 1967), Kuu nagu kustuv päike (The moon like the outgoing sun, 1971), and Must mootorrattur (The Black Motorcyclist, 1976) established his reputation as a major writer. In addition, he was instrumental in bringing avant-garde theatre to post-Soviet Estonia.

Several of his novels have been adapted for film since his death, including Sügisball ("Autumn Ball") in 2007 by Veiko Õunpuu.

English Translations 

 Things in the night. (Öös on asju, 1990) Translated by Eric Dickens. Normal, IL: Dalkey Archive Press, 2006. 
 Diary of a blood donor. (Doonori meelespea, 1990) Translated by Ants Eert. Champaign, IL: Dalkey Archive Press, 2008. 
 Brecht at night. (Brecht ilmub öösel, 1996) Translated by Eric Dickens. Champaign, IL: Dalkey Archive Press, 2009. 
 "An Empty Beach" ("Tühirand", 1972) in The Dedalus Book of Estonian Literature. Edited by Jan Kaus and translated by Eric Dickens. Sawtry: Dedalus Books, 2011.

References

External links
 Obituary by Eric Dickens

1944 births
2005 deaths
People from Mustvee Parish
Estonian male novelists
Estonian dramatists and playwrights
20th-century Estonian novelists
20th-century dramatists and playwrights
Male dramatists and playwrights
20th-century male writers
Burials at Metsakalmistu
Recipients of the Order of the White Star, 3rd Class